Stigmella ebbenielseni is a moth of the family Nepticulidae. It is only known from Guam, Tinian and Alamagan.

The larvae feed on Pipturus argenteus. They mine the leaves of their host plant.

External links
A new Stigmella feeding on Urticaceae from Guam: first records of Nepticulidae (Lepidoptera) from Micronesia and Polynesia

Nepticulidae
Moths of Oceania
Moths described in 2003